This is a list of the major rivers that flow through Ukraine.

Ukraine has around 23,000 rivers. Most of the rivers of Ukraine drain into the Black Sea and Azov Sea and belong to the bigger Mediterranean basin. Those rivers mostly flow in a southerly direction, except for the Pripyat tributaries in Volhynia and Dniester tributaries in Prykarpattia. A few western Ukraine rivers drain to the north west through Poland to the Baltic Sea, as part of the Western Bug drainage basin. The most notable rivers of Ukraine include the Dnieper, Dniester, Southern Buh, and Siversky Donets. The longest river is the Dnieper, the longest tributary is the Dnieper's tributary Desna. Two of the Danube's tributaries in Ukraine, the Prut and the Tysa, are longer than the main river within Ukraine.

The territory of Ukraine can be divided into nine hydrographic zones according to major river basins, including the basins of the Wisla (Western Bug and San), Danube, Dniester, Southern Bug, Dnieper, Don, the rivers of the Black Sea littoral, the Sea of Azov littoral, and separately the rivers of Crimea. The biggest river basin by area is the Dnieper which is subdivided into the Pripyat basin, Desna basin, basin of Middle Dnieper, basin of Lower Dnieper. Beside Dnieper, basin of the Danube zoning is also subdivided into basin of Tysa, basin of Prut and Siret, and basin of the Lower Danube.

List of major rivers in Ukraine
Length is in kilometers.

Black Sea basin
 
 
 
 
 
Sea of Azov basin
 
 
 
 
Baltic Sea basin

Trivia
The most water in Ukraine is carried by Dnieper.

The deepest river of Ukraine is Dniester.

The biggest water amount among distributaries is carried by the Chilia branch.

Gallery

See also 
 Waterfalls of Ukraine
 List of rivers of Europe
 :Category:Rivers of Ukraine

References

Further reading
(Copies of the works are available at the Electronic library "Chtyvo")
 Shvets, H., Drozd, N., Levchenko, S. Catalog of rivers of the Ukrainian SSR. Kyiv: "Publishing of the Academy of Sciences of the Ukrainian SSR", 1957.
 Klymenko, V. Hydrology of Ukraine. Kharkiv: "Karazin National University publishing", 2010.

External links
 Electronic library "Chtyvo"
 Rivers of Ukraine suitable for Rafting
 Matsenko, H. Book of records of Ukraine. Nature around us. "Bohdan Books". 

Ukraine
Rivers
Ukraine